The following is a list of the 19 cantons of the Indre-et-Loire department, in France, following the French canton reorganisation which came into effect in March 2015:

 Amboise
 Ballan-Miré
 Bléré
 Château-Renault
 Chinon
 Descartes
 Joué-lès-Tours
 Langeais
 Loches
 Montlouis-sur-Loire
 Monts
 Saint-Cyr-sur-Loire
 Sainte-Maure-de-Touraine
 Saint-Pierre-des-Corps
 Tours-1
 Tours-2
 Tours-3
 Tours-4
 Vouvray

References